The Capital One Cup is a multi-sport award given to a school to acknowledge athletic success across all sports. Several sports programs from higher-education institutions across the United States are pitted against each other, acquiring points throughout the school year based on how individual sports teams finish in national championships.  Sports are divided into two groups based on popularity and pool of competition, with Group B scoring three times the number of points of Group A. There are separate cups for men's and women's sports. The winning school for both men and women receives $200,000 to their student athlete scholarship fund. Stanford University has won the most titles in both the men's and the women's competitions, with 3 and 7 respectively. Stanford, along with the University of Florida, are the only two schools to win a Capital One Cup in both the men's and women's divisions.

Scoring system 
Unlike the NACDA Directors' Cup which scores each sport equally, the Capital One Cup employs a two-tiered scoring system in which higher profile sports ("Group B") are valued more highly than others ("Group A"). Schools' performances in the Group B sports earn three times as many points as those in Group A. This valuing of certain high-profile sports over smaller, less popular sports has drawn criticism from college sports administrators. In its history, the Capital One Cup has revised its scoring structure on several occasions to adjust such factors as the number of tiers, the inclusion/exclusion of certain sports, and the tier designation of the included sports. With the last revision (2020–21), only 10 sports were given the high-value "Group B" designation.

The current Capital One Cup scoring structure:

Champions

See also 
 NACDA Directors' Cup

References

External links 
 

College sports trophies and awards in the United States
Awards established in 2010